Thylacinidae is an extinct family of carnivorous, superficially dog-like marsupials from the order Dasyuromorphia. The only species to survive into modern times was the thylacine (Thylacinus cynocephalus), which became extinct in 1936.

The consensus on placement of the family is with the Dasyuromorphia order, with agreement on the divergence this family and the Dasyuridae, represented by the extant quolls and Tasmanian devil Sarcophilus harrisii, remaining under consideration.

The thylacinid family was represented by two species in a synonymy published in 1982, the recently extinct Tasmanian tiger and the species Thylacinus potens, known by fossil material. Discoveries of new material, especially in well researched fossil depositions at the Riversleigh World Heritage Area, revealed a diverse array of genera and families existing during Miocene epoch. The dentition of specimens and some largely complete crania showed the development of specialist predators capable of hunting and consuming a range of vertebrate species, and like other mammalian predators, such as the canid family, could include herbivores larger than themselves. An assessment of the size range of the species has provided evidence of animals occupying a greater number of trophic levels and challenged the conception of the dominance of reptilians as large hyper-carnivorous predators on the Australia continent.

The consensus of authors prior to 1982 was that the thylacinid family were related to the borhyaenidae, a group of South American predators, also extinct, that exhibited many similar characteristics of dentition. A review published in 1982 compared the skeletal structure of these groups, concluding the tarsal bones show greater affinity with the dasyurmorphs, strongly supporting the later theory that any dental similarities emerged independently.
 
Another family, the Thylacoleonidae, were also large carnivorous marsupials, but allied to the order Vombatiformes and assumed to have also evolutionarily converged as predators of large herbivores.

Genera
Family Thylacinidae, extinct
Genus Badjcinus Muirhead & Wroe, 1998
Badjcinus turnbulli (Late Oligocene)
Genus Maximucinus Wroe, 2001
Maximucinus muirheadae (Middle Miocene)
Genus Muribacinus Wroe, 1995
Muribacinus gadiyuli (Middle Miocene)
Genus Mutpuracinus Murray & Megirian, 2000
Mutpuracinus archibaldi (Middle Miocene)
Genus Ngamalacinus Muirhead, 1997 
Ngamalacinus timmulvaneyi Early Miocene Riversleigh fauna
Genus Nimbacinus Muirhead & Archer, 1990
Nimbacinus dicksoni (Late Oligocene — Early Miocene)
Nimbacinus richi (Middle Miocene)
Genus Thylacinus Temminck, 1824
Thylacinus cynocephalus, also known as the thylacine (Late Pliocene to Holocene)
Thylacinus macknessi (Early Miocene)
Thylacinus megiriani (Late Miocene)
Thylacinus potens (Early Miocene)
Thylacinus yorkellus (Late Miocene)
Thylacinus breviceps (?)
Genus Tyarrpecinus Murray & Megirian, 2000
Tyarrpecinus rothi (Late Miocene)
Genus Wabulacinus Muirhead, 1997
Wabulacinus ridei  Early Miocene Riversleigh fauna

References

External links
Prehistoric range of the Thylacinidae
Australian Thylacine
Various Links
Mikko's Phylogeny Archive
The thylacine journey

Dasyuromorphs
Extinct animals of Australia
Extinct marsupials
Mammal families
Taxa named by Charles Lucien Bonaparte
Chattian first appearances